Kinshuk Dasgupta is an Indian research scientist  at Bhabha Atomic Research Centre. He also holds an associate professorship at the Homi Bhabha National Institute. He earned his Bachelor in Engineering from Jadavpur University in metallurgy and PhD from the Institute of Chemical Technology, Mumbai in chemical engineering. His research expertise mainly includes work on carbon based nano materials and composite synthesis of the use of nano materials.

Recently, he pioneered in making armour panel protection named Bhabha Kavach against bullets of different threat levels that are light in weight using hard boron carbide ceramics that is hot-pressed with carbon nano-tubes and composite polymer.

He has been awarded the prestigious Shanti Swarup Bhatnagar Prize for Science and Technology, one of the highest Indian science awards for his contributions to Engineering Sciences in 2020. He has also received VASVIK Industrials Research Award in Materials Engineering for the year 2020. He has also been a Fulbright Visiting Scholar during 2018–2019 at University of Cincinnati.

Selected bibliography

Articles

Book chapter

References

External links

Living people
Indian scientists
Homi Bhabha National Institute
Engineers from West Bengal
Institute of Chemical Technology alumni
1977 births